Flamatt Dorf railway station is a railway station in the municipality of Wünnewil-Flamatt, in the Swiss canton of Fribourg. It is located on the standard gauge Flamatt–Laupen line of the Sensetalbahn.

History 
The station re-opened, with the rest of the line, in April 2021.

Services 
 the following services stop at Flamatt Dorf:

References

External links 
 
 

Railway stations in the canton of Fribourg
Sensetalbahn stations